Cemaes Bay Football Club is a football team playing in the North Wales Coast West Football League Division One (part of the Welsh football league system). Between 1995 and 1998 the club played in the League of Wales.

History
A football team is recorded in Cemaes Bay as far back as 1870 and a team of that name played in the Anglesey League between the years 1948 and 1955.

The current Cemaes Bay Football Club was not formed until 1976 and joined the Anglesey League for the 1976–77 season.

The club used the facilities at the nearby Wylfa Nuclear Power Station, playing briefly at a ground next to the Gadlys Hotel in 1980, then returning to Wylfa. The club's present School Lane ground was developed in time for the club to enter the Anglesey League and the League of Wales in 1995.  At the end of the 1990/91 season, they were elected to the Welsh Alliance, the former Welsh League (North).
  
In the 1991–92 season Cemaes Bay won the Cookson Cup, beating Llangefni Town 1–0. They retained the Cup in 1992–93, beating Bangor City's reserve side 5–0. Cemaes Bay also won the Welsh Alliance championship title and gained another promotion to the Cymru Alliance. In 1994–95 a run of 25 league matches without defeat made Cemaes Bay the Cymru Alliance league winners and they were promoted to the League of Wales.

At the end of 1997 the club's main financial backer resigned and they also lost several key players. Cemaes Ynys Mon struggled for the remainder of the 1997–98 season and were relegated to the Cymru Alliance. They regularly challenged at the top of the table for the next four seasons, but in 2004–05 were relegated to the Welsh Alliance and in 2005–06 dropped to the Gwynedd League. In March 2018 Cemaes Bay temporarily became inactive having resigned from the Welsh Alliance League during the season before rejoining the Anglesey League in time for the 2018–19 season.

The club were chosen to host several games during the 2019 Inter Games Football Tournament.

Current squad

Honours
Cymru Alliance – Champions (1): 1994–95
Welsh Alliance League – Champions (1): 1992–93
Cookson Cup – Winners (2): 1991–92, 1992–93
NWCFA Junior Cup – Winners (1): 2021–22

References

Football clubs in Wales
Association football clubs established in 1976
Sport in Anglesey
1976 establishments in Wales
Llanbadrig
Cymru Premier clubs
Cymru Alliance clubs
Gwynedd League clubs
Anglesey League clubs
North Wales Coast Football League clubs
Welsh Alliance League clubs